Die block may refer to:

 A component of a Die (manufacturing)
 A component of a valve gear, such as Walschaerts valve gear